

England

Head Coach: Clive Woodward

 Neil Back
 Iain Balshaw
 Olly Barkley
 Steve Borthwick
 Mike Catt
 Ben Cohen
 Martin Corry
 Lawrence Dallaglio (c.)
 Matt Dawson
 Andy Gomarsall
 Paul Grayson
 Will Greenwood
 Danny Grewcock
 Richard Hill
 Chris Jones
 Ben Kay
 Jason Leonard
 Josh Lewsey
 Henry Paul
 Mark Regan
 Jason Robinson
 Alex Sanderson
 Simon Shaw
 James Simpson-Daniel
 Matt Stevens
 Steve Thompson
 Mike Tindall
 Phil Vickery
 Julian White
 Trevor Woodman
 Joe Worsley

France

Head Coach: Bernard Laporte

 David Auradou
 Serge Betsen
 Julien Bonnaire
 Yannick Bru
 Nicolas Brusque
 Vincent Clerc
 Jean-Jacques Crenca
 Pieter de Villiers
 Christophe Dominici
 Pépito Elhorga
 Jean-Baptiste Élissalde
 Imanol Harinordoquy
 Cédric Heymans
 Yannick Jauzion
 Brian Liebenberg
 Thomas Lièvremont
 Olivier Magne
 Sylvain Marconnet
 Frédéric Michalak
 Pierre Mignoni
 Pascal Papé
 Fabien Pelous (c)
 Julien Peyrelongue
 Clément Poitrenaud
 Aurélien Rougerie
 William Servat
 Damien Traille
 Dimitri Yachvili

Ireland

Head Coach: Eddie O'Sullivan

 Simon Best
 Shane Byrne
 Reggie Corrigan
 Victor Costello
 Gordon D'Arcy
 Girvan Dempsey
 Guy Easterby
 Simon Easterby
 Anthony Foley
 Keith Gleeson
 John Hayes
 Marcus Horan
 Anthony Horgan
 Shane Horgan
 Tyrone Howe
 David Humphreys
 Gary Longwell
 Kevin Maggs
 Geordan Murphy
 Donncha O'Callaghan
 Paul O'Connell (c.)*
 Brian O'Driscoll (c.)
 Ronan O'Gara
 Malcolm O'Kelly
 Frankie Sheahan
 Peter Stringer
 David Wallace

*captain in the first game

Italy

Head Coach: John Kirwan

 Matteo Barbini
 Mirco Bergamasco
 Marco Bortolami
 Gonzalo Canale
 Martin Castrogiovanni
 Carlo Checchinato
 Denis Dallan
 Manuel Dallan
 Roland de Marigny
 Andrea de Rossi (c.)
 Carlo Del Fava
 Santiago Dellapè
 Carlo Festuccia
 Paul Griffen
 Andrea Lo Cicero
 Roberto Mandelli
 Andrea Masi
 Nicola Mazzucato
 Fabio Ongaro
 Silvio Orlando
 Scott Palmer
 Sergio Parisse
 Aaron Persico
 Salvatore Perugini
 Simon Picone
 Cristian Stoica
 Rima Wakarua

Scotland

Head Coach: Matt Williams

 Mike Blair
 Gordon Bulloch
 Chris Cusiter
 Simon Danielli
 Bruce Douglas
 Stuart Grimes
 Andrew Henderson
 Nathan Hines
 Ben Hinshelwood
 Allister Hogg
 Allan Jacobsen
 Gavin Kerr
 Brendan Laney
 Derrick Lee
 Cameron Mather
 Scott Murray
 Dan Parks
 Chris Paterson (c.)
 Jon Petrie
 Tom Philip
 Robbie Russell
 Tom Smith
 Simon Taylor
 Simon Webster
 Jason White

Wales

Head Coach: Steve Hansen

 Huw Bennett
 Colin Charvis (c.)
 Brent Cockbain
 Gareth Cooper
 Mefin Davies
 Ben Evans
 Iestyn Harris
 Gethin Jenkins
 Adam Jones
 Dafydd Jones
 Duncan Jones
 Stephen Jones
 Gareth Llewellyn
 Robin McBryde
 Michael Owen
 Sonny Parker
 Dwayne Peel
 Alix Popham
 Jamie Robinson
 Tom Shanklin
 Robert Sidoli
 Ceri Sweeney
 Mark Taylor
 Gareth Thomas
 Iestyn Thomas
 Jonathan Thomas
 Martyn Williams (c.)*
 Rhys Williams
 Shane Williams

*captain in the second game

External links

2004
2004 Six Nations Championship